Janak Raj is the current MLA for the Bharmour constituency in the Himachal Pradesh Legislative Assembly. He was elected at the December 2022 Legislative Assembly election.

Raj is uncle of Thakur Singh Bharmouri  in relation whom he defeated  Indian National Congress leader and former minister.

Janak Raj is a neurosurgeon by profession. He served as the medical superintendent of Indira Gandhi Medical College and Hospital, Shimla.

References 

Living people
Indian politicians
Himachal Pradesh MLAs 2022–2027
Year of birth missing (living people)